Renzo Nostini (27 May 1914 – 1 October 2005) was an Italian fencer. He won four silver medals, two at the 1948 Summer Olympics and two more at the 1952 Summer Olympics.

See also
Italy national fencing team - Multiple medallist

References

External links
 

1914 births
2005 deaths
Italian male foil fencers
Olympic fencers of Italy
Fencers at the 1948 Summer Olympics
Fencers at the 1952 Summer Olympics
Olympic silver medalists for Italy
Olympic medalists in fencing
Fencers from Rome
Medalists at the 1948 Summer Olympics
Medalists at the 1952 Summer Olympics
Italian male sabre fencers